Cheiracanthium campestre is a spider species found in Europe.

References 

campestre
Spiders of Europe
Spiders described in 1944